The 2015 4 Nations Cup was a women's ice hockey tournament held in Kovland, Njurunda, and Sundsvall, Sweden. It was the 20th edition of the 4 Nations Cup.

Results

Preliminary round

Bronze medal game

Gold medal game

Statistics

Final standings

External links
Tournament recap

2015
2015–16 in American women's ice hockey
2015–16 in Canadian women's ice hockey
2015–16 in Finnish ice hockey
2015–16 in Swedish ice hockey
2015–16 in women's ice hockey
2015